Diego Higino Nascimento (born September 14, 1986 in Salvador), is a Brazilian football striker who is currently a free agent.

Honours
Topscorer: Bahia State Second Division (U-20) 2006
Best player: Bahia State Second Division (U-20) 2006
Best player: Supercopa da Bahia (U-20) 2006
Topscorer: Bahia State Second Division 2007

External links

CBF 
Zerozero

1986 births
Sportspeople from Bahia
Living people
Brazilian footballers
Brazilian expatriate footballers
Association football forwards
Campeonato Brasileiro Série A players
Campeonato Brasileiro Série B players
Galícia Esporte Clube players
América Futebol Clube (RN) players
CR Vasco da Gama players
Juazeiro Social Clube players
Alagoinhas Atlético Clube players
Centro Educativo Recreativo Associação Atlética São Mateus players
Esporte Clube Jacuipense players
Associação Esportiva Velo Clube Rioclarense players
Associação Atlética Anapolina players
Yuen Long FC players
Dreams Sports Club players
Hong Kong Premier League players
Brazilian expatriate sportspeople in Hong Kong